The 22483/22484 Gandhidham–Jodhpur Express is a Superfast train belonging to North Western Railway zone that runs between  and  in India. It is currently being operated with 22483/22484 train numbers on tri-weekly basis.

Coach composition

The train has standard ICF rakes with max speed of 110 kmph. The train consists of 12 coaches :

 1 AC III Tier
 3 Sleeper Coaches
 6 General Unreserved
 2 Seating cum Luggage Rake

Service

The 22483/Jodhpur–Gandhidham Express has an average speed of 56 km/hr and covers 560 km in 09 hrs 55 mins.

The 22484/Gandhidham–Jodhpur Express has an average speed of 59 km/hr and covers 560 km in 09 hrs 25 mins.

Route and halts 

The important halts of the train are:

Schedule

Traction

Both trains are hauled by a Diesel Loco Shed, Bhagat Ki Kothi-based WDP-4.

References

Rail transport in Gujarat
Rail transport in Rajasthan
Transport in Kutch district
Transport in Jodhpur
Transport in Gandhidham
Express trains in India